Trương Hòa Bình (born 13 April 1955) is a Vietnamese  politician and the former First Deputy Prime Minister of The Socialist Republic of Vietnam. He is considered to be one of the more promising members' of the Vietnamese Government, having previously served as Chief Justice of the Supreme People's Court of Vietnam from 2007 to 2016.

Before 1975 Trương Hòa Bình was nicknamed Nguyễn Văn Bình, also known as Sáu Đạt (Six Dat), native in Phuoc Vinh Dong, Can Giuoc, Long An province.

His father Trương Văn Bang was a former Secretary of the Southern Party and Secretary of Saigon-Gia Dinh. He was considered to be one of the first regimental commanders of the revolutionary armed forces in South Vietnam, having participated in the robbery of the Saigon government. He was active in 1945 and in the beginning of the resistance war against the French in the East, which the South then called the Three Kingdoms.

His mother was Nguyễn Thị Nho (Nguyễn Thị Một) was a member of the Communist Party from 1935 to 1936 who had served as a member of the Can Giuoc District Commissioner, Standing Vice President of the Tay Ninh Provincial Party Committee. Eastern women. In 1955, she was assigned to Chief of the Southern Party Committee, when Lê Duẩn was Secretary of the Southern Party Committee. In 1959, she was imprisoned and tortured by the South Vietnamese Secret Service, but she remained faithful and loyal to the Community Party. Later, she joined and became a member of the Long An Provincial Assembly.

References

Chief justices
Vietnamese judges
Members of the 12th Politburo of the Communist Party of Vietnam
Members of the 11th Secretariat of the Communist Party of Vietnam
Members of the 10th Central Committee of the Communist Party of Vietnam
Members of the 11th Central Committee of the Communist Party of Vietnam
Members of the 12th Central Committee of the Communist Party of Vietnam
1955 births
Living people
Members of the National Assembly (Vietnam)
Chief justices of Vietnam
People from Long An Province
Deputy Prime Ministers of Vietnam